Bogoroditskoye is a rural locality (a settlement) in Dmitriyevskoye Rural Settlement, Paninsky District, Voronezh Oblast, Russia. The population was 35 as of 2010.

Geography 
Bogoroditskoye is located on the Pravaya Khava River, 22 km northwest of Panino (the district's administrative centre) by road. Dmitriyevka is the nearest rural locality.

References 

Rural localities in Paninsky District